Ballinaclash is a village in east County Wicklow centred on a bridge that carries the R753 regional road across the River Avonbeg. 

The village is mentioned in J.M. Synge's play 'The Tinker's Wedding': "And a big fool I was too, maybe; but we'll be seeing Jaunting Jim to-morrow in Ballinaclash, and he after getting a great price for his white foal in the horse-fair of Wicklow"

In 1837, the village had a population of 3855 according to Samuel Lewis' 'A Topographical Dictionary of Ireland'. This population was much reduced by the famine and subsequent emigration and today is only a fraction of that number.
The village was originally the site of an ancient monastery founded by the brother of St. Kevin, according to Mervyn Archdall. The site is now occupied by Whaley Abbey; the home of the notorious Buck Whaley.

See also
 List of towns and villages in Ireland

References

Towns and villages in County Wicklow